Fatma Tuba Yazıcı (born 1973/74) is a Turkish billionaire businesswoman. Together with her three sons, she is the largest shareholder in Diler Holding.

Diler Holding owns Diler Iron and Steel, Yazici Iron and Steel, Diler Investment Bank and the 2,000-bed Cornelia Deluxe Hotel in Antalya.

Her husband Recep Sami Yazici died unexpectedly in 2009. Vargı is widowed, with three children, and lives in Istanbul, Turkey.

References

1970s births
Female billionaires
Living people
Turkish billionaires
Turkish businesspeople